"Vice City" is a song by American rapper Jay Rock, taken from his second studio album, 90059. The song, which was produced by Cardo, features guest appearances from Rock's fellow TDE label-mates Kendrick Lamar, Schoolboy Q and Ab-Soul, credited as they are collectively known, Black Hippy. The song takes its name from the 2002 video game Grand Theft Auto: Vice City.

Release
The song was first premiered on Top Dawg Entertainment's YouTube page, when the music video was released hours before the album release.

Music video

The song's music video was released on September 10, 2015, hours before the release of the album. The video was filmed in a warehouse and features the Black Hippy members rapping in front of the camera in turn.

Charts

References

2015 songs
Jay Rock songs
Songs written by Kendrick Lamar
Songs written by Schoolboy Q
Black-and-white music videos
Song recordings produced by Cardo (record producer)
Posse cuts
Songs written by Jay Rock